Luna Sea is the second album by Firefall, released in 1977. It featured the single "Just Remember I Love You" which reached #11 on the Billboard Hot 100 and #1 on the Adult Contemporary chart.
The title is a pun on "lunacy".

Track listing 
 "So Long" – 5:20 (Rick Roberts)
 "Just Remember I Love You" – 3:16 (Rick Roberts)
 "Sold on You" – 3:30 (Larry Burnett)
 "Someday Soon" – 4:03 (Rick Roberts)
 "Just Think" – 4:10 (Firefall)
 "Getaway" – 3:44 (Larry Burnett)
 "Only a Fool" – 4:23 (Rick Roberts)
 "Head on Home" – 4:02  (Larry Burnett)
 "Piece of Paper" – 4:05 (Larry Burnett)
 "Even Steven" – 4:18 (Larry Burnett, Rick Roberts)

Charts

Personnel 
 Rick Roberts - lead vocals, rhythm acoustic guitar
 Larry Burnett - lead vocals, rhythm electric and acoustic guitars
 Jock Bartley - lead electric and acoustic guitars, backing vocals, electric slide guitar
 David Muse - keyboards, organ, Moog synthesizer, tenor saxophone, flute, harmonica
 Mark Andes - bass, backing vocals
 Michael Clarke - drums

References

1977 albums
Firefall albums
Atlantic Records albums